Zeno Beach is a rock album by Australian band Radio Birdman released in June 2006. It maintains much of the sound the band had in the 1970s while adding a different style with You Am I drummer, Russell Hopkinson.

Track listing
 "We've Come So Far (To Be Here Today)" (Younger, Tek) – 3:45
 "You Just Make It Worse" (Younger, Dickson, Tek) – 2:53
 "Remorseless" (Tek) – 3:41
 "Found Dead" (Tek) – 3:43
 "Connected" (Tek) – 3:03
 "Die Like April" (Tek) – 3:09
 "Heyday" (Younger, Tek) – 4:20
 "Subterfuge" (Younger, Tek) – 3:26
 "If You Say Please" (Younger, Masuak) – 3:04
 "Hungry Cannibals" (Tek, Masuak, Dickson) – 3:21
 "Locked Up" (Tek) – 3:48
 "The Brotherhood of Al Wazah" (Hoyle) – 5:30
 "Zeno Beach" (Hoyle) – 2:55

Personnel
 Radio Birdman
Chris Masuak – guitar
Jim Dickson – bass
Russell Hopkinson – drums
Pip Hoyle – keyboards
Deniz Tek – guitar
Rob Younger – vocals

 Production
Produced by Deniz Tek with Greg Wales
Recorded by Greg Wales at BJB Studios, Surry Hills
Mixed by Greg Wales at The Vault, Balmain
Mastered by Steve Smart at Studios 301
Management – John Needham
Cover art painting – Adrian Turner
Band photography – Tony Mott
Studio photography – Deniz Tek
Design – Cameron Moss & Ultra Vivid

Charts

References

2006 albums
Radio Birdman albums